The Kindergarten Stakes, is an Australian Turf Club Group 3 Australian Thoroughbred horse race for horses aged two years old, at set weights, over a distance of 1100 metres at Randwick Racecourse, Sydney, Australia in the autumn during the ATC Championships series.

History

The race was inaugurated in 1987.

It was held annually in March prior to the Golden Slipper Stakes but in 2012 was moved to April as part of the Australian Derby Day race card at Randwick.

The following thoroughbreds have captured the Kindergarten Stakes – Golden Slipper double: Star Watch (1988), Bint Marscay (1993), Guineas (1997), Belle Du Jour (2000) and Forensics (2007)

Grade
1989–1997 - Listed Race
1998 onwards  - Group 3

Venue
 1987–1994 - Warwick Farm
 1995 - Randwick
 1996–2000 - Warwick Farm 
 2001 - Randwick
 2002–2007 - Warwick Farm 
 2008–2009 - Randwick
 2010 - Warwick Farm 
 2011 onwards - Randwick

Venue
 Prior to 2017 - Kindergarten Stakes
 2017 - Widden 150th Anniversary Stakes

Winners

 2022 - Semillion
 2021 - Paulele
 2020 - Doubtland
 2019 - Bivouac
 2018 - Paquirri
 2017 - Property
 2016 - El Divino / Astern
 2015 - Furnaces
 2014 - Hallowed Crown
 2013 - Safeguard
 2012 - Dance On Stars
 2011 - Anise
 2010 - Solar Charged
 2009 - Wanted
 2008 - Mr Profumo
 2007 - Forensics
 2006 - Plagiarize
 2005 - Flying Pegasus
 2004 - Crimson Reign
 2003 - Niello
 2002 - Snowland
 2001 - Royal Courtship
 2000 - Belle Du Jour
 1999 - Easy Rocking
 1998 - Peat Bog
 1997 - Guineas
 1996 - Armidale
 1995 - Furacao
 1994 - Dr. Zackary
 1993 - Bint Marscay
 1992 - Slight Chance
 1991 - Vionnet
 1990 - Bold Tie
 1989 - Show County
 1988 - Star Watch
 1987 - Christmas Tree

Notes:
  Dead heat
  Date of race rescheduled due to postponement of the Easter Saturday meeting because of the heavy track conditions. The meeting was moved to Easter Monday, 6 April 2015.

See also
 List of Australian Group races
 Group races

External links 
Kindergarten Stakes (ATC)

References

Horse races in Australia